The Merrie Men of Sherwood Forest, or Forest Days in the Olden Time is a pastoral operetta in three acts. The words and music were written by W. H. Birch and the work was published by John Blockley of Argyll Street, London.

Performance history
In 1871 it was performed in concert by the Doncaster Musical Society, and then again in 1872. A critic noted the derivative nature of the work, remarking that it was "suggestive of others". As with many of Blockley's operettas, the work could be performed free of charge.

Roles
Robin Hood (tenor) 
Marian (soprano) 
Little John (bass) 
Will Scarlet (baritone) 
Friar Tuck (bass)
Much the Miller's son (tenor) 
Holy Palmer (bass)
Sheriff of Nottingham (bass)  
Chorus of maidens and foresters

External links
 Article on Robin Hood in music

English-language operettas
Operas
Depictions of Robin Hood in music